William McKeag (born 30 November 1945) is a Northern Irish former professional footballer who played as a full back.

Career
Born in Belfast, McKeag played for Willowfield, Glentoran and the Detroit Cougars. He also earned two caps for the Northern Ireland national team.

References

1945 births
Living people
Association footballers from Northern Ireland
Northern Ireland international footballers
Willowfield F.C. players
Glentoran F.C. players
NIFL Premiership players
United Soccer Association players
Association football fullbacks
Expatriate association footballers from Northern Ireland
Expatriate soccer players in the United States
Expatriate sportspeople from Northern Ireland in the United States